The Attorney General of Georgia is the chief law enforcement officer and lawyer for the U.S. state of Georgia. The officeholder is elected to a four-year term at the same time as elections are held for Governor of Georgia and other offices.

The current Attorney General of Georgia is Christopher M. Carr. Carr was appointed by Governor Nathan Deal following the resignation of Sam Olens, who was officially appointed to the office of President of Kennesaw State University on November 1, 2016. Carr completed Olens' unexpired term, which expired in January 2019. Carr was re-elected to a four-year term in Georgia's 2018 statewide elections.

Attorneys General, 1754–present

Pre-Statehood

Post-Statehood

References

External links
 Georgia Attorney General articles at ABA Journal
 News and Commentary at FindLaw
 Georgia Code at Law.Justia.com
 U.S. Supreme Court Opinions - "Cases with title containing: State of Georgia" at FindLaw
 State Bar of Georgia
 Georgia Attorney General Sam Olens profile at National Association of Attorneys General
 Press releases at Georgia Attorney General's office

Lists of Georgia (U.S. state) politicians
1776 establishments in Georgia (U.S. state)